Novo Čiče  is a village in Croatia, situated about 4 km south east from center of Velika Gorica. Novo Čiče is well known for its lake, created by gravel mining.

First records of the village date from 14th century when it was recorded as fiefdom near castle Želin.

External links

Populated places in Zagreb County
Velika Gorica